Willi Völker (13 October 1906 – 23 February 1946) was a German footballer who played as a defender for Hertha BSC and the Germany national team.

Personal life
Völker served as a Gefreiter (private) in the German Army during the Second World War. Captured by Soviet forces, he died in a prisoner of war camp on 23 February 1946.

References

1906 births
1946 deaths
Association football defenders
German footballers
Footballers from Berlin
Germany international footballers
Hertha BSC players
German Army soldiers of World War II
German prisoners of war in World War II held by the Soviet Union
German people who died in Soviet detention